Political "spring" is a term popularized in the late twentieth century to refer to any of a number of student protests, revolutionary political movements or revolutionary waves. It originated in the European Revolutions of 1848, which was sometimes referred to as the "Spring of Nations" or "Springtime of the Peoples".

Prague Spring, a period of political liberalization of the Czechoslovak Socialist Republic in 1968
Croatian Spring, a 1971 movement for Croatian language rights and cultural identity in the second Yugoslavia
Beijing Spring, a period of political liberalization in the People's Republic of China in the late 1970s
Seoul Spring, a period of democratization in South Korea in the late 1970s and early 1980s
Rangoon Spring, sometimes used to describe the period leading up to the August 8, 1988 "8888" Uprising
Kathmandu Spring, sometimes used to describe the 1990 People's Movement in Nepal, as well as subsequent democratic movements.
Tehran Spring, sometimes used to describe the period in Iran during the 1997–2005 presidency of Mohammad Khatami
Damascus Spring, period in Syria following the death of Hafez al-Assad in 2001
Cedar Spring was a chain of demonstrations in Lebanon (especially in the capital Beirut) triggered by the assassination of the former Lebanese Prime Minister Rafik Hariri on February 14, 2005.
Harare Spring, sometimes used to describe the period in Zimbabwe after the 2008 power sharing agreement between Robert Mugabe and Morgan Tsvangirai
Arab Spring, another term for the Middle East—North Africa protest of 2010–2014
Riyadh Spring, sometimes used to describe the 2011–12 Saudi Arabian protests. 
The 2012 Quebec student protests movement is also called the 'Maple' Spring, from the French "" which sounds phonetically similar to "" (Arab Spring). "Printemps Québécois" for "Quebec Spring" is also used.
The 2012 Valencia student protests, also called . In February 2012 the students of the Lluís Vives High school participated in several demonstrations to protest against the cutbacks in the educational budgets of the Valencian Autonomous Community. The police’s performance in those demonstrations was extremely controversial and appeared in many international media. This sparked the interest of Parents Associations and both Student and International organisations, such as Amnesty International and Save the Children. The documentary Spanish Teen Rally collect the testimony of Valencian Spring's students.
Venezuelan Spring, sometimes used to describe the 2014 Venezuelan protests.
Russian Spring, sometimes used to describe the 2014 pro-Russian unrest in Ukraine.
Latin American spring, sometimes used to describe mass protest events that took place in Latin America between 2019 and 2022.

External links 

Political terminology